2020 in philosophy

Events

Planned events
January 8-11 - the American Philosophical Association held its annual Eastern Division Meeting in Philadelphia, Pennsylvania. 
February 26-29 - the American Philosophical Association held its annual Central Division Meeting in Chicago, Illinois. 
The American Philosophical Association did not hold its annual Pacific Division Meeting in San Francisco, California as had previously been planned due to the pandemic. 
Aaron Sloman is awarded the 2020 Barwise Prize.
Paul Farmer wins the 2020 Berggruen Prize.
Sarah Buss, Robert Gooding-Williams, and Susanna Schellenberg are awarded Guggenheim Fellowships in philosophy.
Griselda Pollock is awarded the 2020 Holberg Prize.
Leda Cosmides and John Tooby are awarded the 2020 Jean Nicod Prize.
Nicholas Shea is awarded the Lakatos Award.
Dag Prawitz and Per Martin-Löf are awarded the 2020 Rolf Schock Prize in Logic and Philosophy.

Publications
 Manel Pretel-Wilson, Utopics: The Unification of Human Science (Springer).
Peter Sloterdijk, Making the Heavens Speak (Den Himmel zum Sprechen bringen) (Suhrkamp Verlag)

Planned publications
Karl Ameriks, Kantian Subjects: Critical Philosophy and Late Modernity (Oxford University Press). 
Dimitria Electra Gatzia and Berit Brogaard (ed.), The Epistemology of Non-Visual Perception (Oxford University Press). 
John Gardner (d. 2019), Torts and Other Wrongs (Oxford University Press).
Béatrice Longuenesse, The First Person in Cognition and Morality: The Spinoza Lectures (Oxford University Press).

Deaths
January 3 - Douglas N. Walton, Canadian philosopher and logician (b. 1942). 
January 5 - Colin Howson, British philosopher (b. 1945). 
January 9 - David Efird, American philosopher and Anglican priest (b. 1974).
January 12 - Roger Scruton, English philosopher (b. 1944).
January 17 - Emanuele Severino, Italian philosopher (b. 1929).
February 15 - Jack Macintosh, philosopher known for his work in the history and philosophy of science, especially on Robert Boyle (b. 1934).
February 25 - Mario Bunge, Argentine philosopher of science and physicist who was mainly active in Canada (b. 1919).
June 21 - Hugh Mellor, British philosopher working primarily in metaphysics (b. 1938).
June 28 - Eliot Deutsch, comparative philosopher (b. 1931).
August 5 - Bernard Stiegler, French philosopher (b. 1952).
November 20 - Judith Jarvis Thomson, American ethicist (b. 1929).
November 22 - Raimo Tuomela, Finnish philosopher (b. 1940).

References

2020-related lists
Philosophy by year
21st-century philosophy